This is a list of deaf firsts noting the first time that a deaf person achieved a given historical feat. This list also includes some deafblind persons.

Academics 
 Ferdinand Berthier, French deaf educator, intellectual and political organiser, first deaf person to receive the Legion of Honour (1849)
 Helen Keller, American author, disability rights advocate, political activist and lecturer, first deafblind person to earn a Bachelor of Arts degree (1904) 
 Pierre Gorman, Australian librarian, academic and educator of children with disabilities, first deaf person to receive a PhD at Cambridge University (1960). 
 Geraldine Lawhorn, American musician, actress and instructor, first deafblind African-American person to earn a college degree (1983)
 Irving King Jordan, American educator, first deaf president of Gallaudet University (1988)
 Haben Girma, American lawyer and advocate, first deafblind graduate of Harvard Law School (2013).

Sports 
 Ed Dundon, American baseball pitcher and first deaf player in MLB (1883-1884)
 Lance Allred, American basketball forward and first legally-deaf NBA player (2008)

Actors 
 Marlee Matlin, American actress, first deaf winner of an Academy Award for Best Actress for her role in Children of a Lesser God (1986)
 Troy Kotsur, American actor, first deaf man to win an Academy Award for acting; he won the Academy Award for Best Supporting Actor for his role in CODA (2022)

Other 
 Henry Winter Syle, American cleric, first deaf person to be ordained a priest in the Episcopal Church in the United States (1883).
 Wilma Newhoudt-Druchen, South African politician, first deaf female Member of Parliament in the world
 Heather Whitestone, first deaf woman to win the title of Miss America (1995)

See also
 Deaf history
 List of deaf people

References

Deaf
 Firsts